Helen Craig McCullough (February 17, 1918 – April 6, 1998) was an American academic, translator and Japanologist.  She is best known for her 1988 translation of The Tale of the Heike.

Early life
McCullough was born in California.  She graduated from the University of California, Berkeley in 1939 with a degree in political science. Early in World War II, she studied Japanese at the U.S. Navy’s Language School in Boulder, Colorado. In 1950, she returned to Berkeley where she earned an MA and PhD. She married fellow Berkeley graduate student William H. McCullough.

Career
McCullough was a scholar of classical Japanese poetry and prose. She was a lecturer at Stanford, where her husband William was on the faculty (1964-1969).  In 1969, she and William both joined the Department of Oriental Languages at Berkeley, her alma mater, where she began as lecturer and later received tenure as Professor of Oriental Languages in 1975.

Selected works
McCullough’s scholarly publications included 11 volumes of studies and translations. Her publications included the study Brocade by Night: 'Kokin Wakashu' and the Court Style in Japanese Classical Poetry and translations of major works of Japanese literature:
Taiheiki a Chronicle of Medieval Japan
Yoshitsune A 15th Century Japanese Chronicle
The Tale of the Heike
Kokin Wakashu: The First Imperial Anthology of Japanese Poetry
Tales of Ise: Lyrical Episodes from 10th Century Japan (Ariwara no Narihira)
Okagami, the Great Mirror: Fujiwara Michinaga (966-1027 and His Times : a Study and Translation)
  ;  (2 vols.)  -- the Eiga Monogatari

Honors
Her honors included several visiting professorships and a Medal of Honor from the Japanese government.

References

Japanese–English translators
Japanese literature academics
University of California, Berkeley alumni
Stanford University faculty
University of California, Berkeley faculty
1918 births
1998 deaths
20th-century American translators
Ise Monogatari
20th-century American women writers